WR 114 is a Wolf-Rayet star in the constellation of Scutum.  It is an early type star of the carbon sequence (WCE) classified as WC5.

Companion
WR 114 is listed in the Catalogue of galactic Wolf Rayet stars as a possible binary system with an OB companion, but more recent studies have not confirmed this and it is now considered a single WC5 star.  No x-rays have been detected from WR 114, which would be expected by a close hot companion.

Properties
The modelled temperature as a single star is 79,000 K, but this is an arbitrary temperature. A Wolf-Rayet star consists of a dense "core", with its surface defined as the sonic point, and a surrounding optically dense wind. The observed radiation from the star is entirely generated at different layers within the wind. The properties of a Wolf Rayet star are typically reported at an "inner boundary" of the wind, arbitrarily set at an optical depth of 20. The sonic point of WR 114 lies at about optical depth 60. At this level the temperature is much hotter. Another common definition for the surface of a star is at optical depth 2/3.

The stellar wind from WR 114 is powered by the high temperature and luminosity to a speed of 2,000 km/s.

RAFGL 2139

WR 114 is about 45" from another luminous star of similar brightness.  RAFGL 2139 is a red supergiant about 6,500 light years away.  At this distance, the projected separation between the two stars would be 0.43 parsecs.  WR 114 is listed in the Catalogue of galactic Wolf Rayet stars at around 6,500 light years, but more recent modelling estimates it to be brighter and hence probably more distant.  RAFGL 2139 is a runaway with a visible bow shock and it is thought that a Wolf-Rayet star less than half a parsec away would disrupt the bow shock.  It is still speculated that the two stars may have a common origin.

References

Wolf–Rayet stars
Scutum (constellation)
169010
J18231633-1343261
TIC objects